Harrison Township is a former township of Boone County, Arkansas, USA.  Its last appearance on the US Census was in 1930.

Today, much of the city of Harrison is in the townships of North Harrison and South Harrison.

Cities, towns, villages
Harrison
At the time this township existed, Harrison was considered a town.  In modern times, Harrison is a city.

Population history

References
 United States Census Bureau 2008 TIGER/Line Shapefiles
 United States Board on Geographic Names (GNIS)
 United States National Atlas

External links
 US-Counties.com
 City-Data.com

Townships in Boone County, Arkansas
Townships in Arkansas